The 2019–20 LEN Champions League was the 57th edition of LEN's premier competition for men's water polo clubs. The season started on 30 September 2019 and played its last games on 4 March 2020 due to the COVID-19 pandemic.

Teams

Schedule
The schedule of the competition is as follows.

Qualifying rounds

Qualification round I

Group A

Group B

Qualification round II

Group A

Group B

Group C

Group D

Qualification round III

|}

Preliminary round

The draw for the 2019–20 LEN Champions League preliminary round has been conducted in Barcelona. In the regular season, teams will play against each other home-and-away in a round-robin format. The top four teams in group A and the top three teams in group B will advance to the Final 8. Also, Pro Recco will participate in the Final 8 as the host of tournament. The matchdays will be from 8 October 2019 to 20 May 2020. Teams are ranked according to points (3 points for a win, 1 point for a draw, 0 points for a loss), and if tied on points, the following tiebreaking criteria are applied, in the order given, to determine the rankings:

Points in head-to-head matches among tied teams;
Goal difference in head-to-head matches among tied teams;
Goals scored in head-to-head matches among tied teams;
Goal difference in all group matches;
Goals scored in all group matches.

Group A

Group B

Final 8
5–7 June 2020, Recco, Italy.

Qualified teams

Bracket

5th–8th place bracket

Quarterfinals

5th–8th place semifinals

Semifinals

Seventh place game

Fifth place game

Third place game

Final

Final ranking

See also
2019–20 LEN Euro Cup
2019 LEN Super Cup

References

Notes

External links

LEN Champions League seasons
Champions League
2019 in water polo
2020 in water polo
LEN Champions League